St. John's Lodge in Portsmouth, New Hampshire, United States, is the oldest Masonic lodge in New Hampshire and was one of two founding lodges of the Grand Lodge of New Hampshire. It was founded either in 1734 or in 1736 and claims to be the oldest continuously operating Masonic lodge in the Americas, a title also claimed by Solomon's Lodge in Savannah, Georgia, which was founded in 1734.

History
In 1735, six freemasons, who claimed to be of the "Holy and exquisite Lodge of St. John," applied to the Grand Master of the Society of Free and Accepted Masons in Boston to be authorized as a lodge. In their application, dated to both February 5, 1736 and June 25, 1735, they claimed that they had a constitution formed, and it was believed that the petition was granted soon after. According to the Grand Lodge of New Hampshire, "Robert Tomlinson, by virtue of a deputation from the Earl of Loundon, Grand Master of Masons in England, did. in the year 1736, erect and constitute a regular lodge of Free and Accepted Masons in Portsmouth, New Hampshire, by the name of St. John's Lodge." Although the exact date of when the lodge was established is unknown, it is certain that it existed since 1736.

They would be the only lodge in New Hampshire until March 20, 1762, when the Grand Lodge of St. John's allowed for Portsmouth to have a second lodge, St. Patrick's, which was not acted upon until March 30, 1763. When St. Patrick's Lodge discontinued in 1790, its remaining members merged with the St. John's Lodge.

In 1789, representatives of five lodges, including St John's, gathered at Portsmouth and resolved, "That there be a Grand Lodge established in the State of New Hampshire, upon principles consistent with and subordinate to the General Regulations and Ancient Constitutions of Free- masonry." Soon after, the Grand Lodge of New Hampshire was formed and was finalized on April 8, 1790. Until that time, St. John's was under the Massachusetts Grand Lodge and applied for a transfer to the New Hampshire lodge on April 28, 1790. During the meetings determining the foundation of the New Hampshire Grand Lodge, only a representative from St John's Lodge was present at each.

Community
St John’s Lodge regularly supports charities and community events such as Big Brothers Big Sisters of America, Boy Scouts, and Toys for Tots, along with several academic scholarships. The lodge also manages and sponsors the annual Out of Hibernation 5K road race which takes place every April in Portsmouth, on a Saturday. Proceeds from this road race are donated to various charities such as the Wounded Warrior Project and the Seacoast Family Food Pantry.

St. John's Lodge celebrated its 275th anniversary of continuous operation in 2011 with a parade through Downtown Portsmouth.

Prominent members
Many members of St. John's Lodge have held prestigious positions throughout history in the armed forces, government, and public service, including twelve mayors of Portsmouth, New Hampshire. Several prominent members of the Lodge are listed below.

References

New Hampshire in the American Revolution
Organizations based in New Hampshire
Masonic Lodges